The Lost Pages is the debut album by The Violets, released in 2007. According to Allmusic there is an "uncanny" vocal similarity to Siouxsie Sioux and a strong resemblance of other late 1970s indie rock acts from the United Kingdom such as The Cure and The Rutles.

Track listing
All tracks written by The Violets

"Shade To Be"
"Descend"
"Troubles Of Keneat"
"In Your Statue"
"Forget Me Not"
"Co-Plax"
"Foreo"
"Hush Away"
"Half Light"
"Parting Glances"
"Nature Of Obsession"

Personnel
 Alexis Mary - Vocals, Melodica, Piano
 Joe Daniel - Guitar, Bass, Synths, Noise
 Andrew Moran - Drums. Percussion

References

2007 debut albums
The Violets albums
Angular Recording Corporation albums